Forbidden Valley is a 1938 American action film written and directed by Wyndham Gittens. It is based on the 1937 novel The Mountains Are My Kingdom by Stuart Hardy. The film stars Noah Beery Jr., Frances Robinson, Robert Barrat, Fred Kohler, Alonzo Price and Samuel S. Hinds. The film was released on February 13, 1938, by Universal Pictures.

Plot
Ring Hazzard was raised alone by his father in a secret valley, until one day he saves a girl from a wild horse stampede, his father is killed in the stampede and Ring and the girl head to the town of Gunsight to sell some mustangs Ring captured.

Cast        
Noah Beery Jr. as Ring Hazzard
Frances Robinson as Wilda Lanning
Robert Barrat as Ramrod Locke
Fred Kohler as Matt Rogan
Alonzo Price as Indian Joe
Samuel S. Hinds as Jeff Hazzard
Stanley Andrews as Hoke Lanning
Spencer Charters as Dr. Scudd
Charles Stevens as Blackjack
Soledad Jiménez as Meetah
Margaret McWade as Mrs. Scudd
Henry Hunter as Bagley
John Ridgely as Duke Lafferty
James Foran as Brandon
Ferris Taylor as Sheriff Walcott

References

External links
 

1938 films
American action films
1930s action films
Universal Pictures films
American black-and-white films
1930s English-language films
1930s American films